Plantago cornuti is a species of plant belonging to the family Plantaginaceae.

It is native to Europe and Asia-Temperate.

References

cornuti